Kingskettle railway station served the village of Kingskettle, Fife, Scotland, from 1847 to 1967 on the Edinburgh and Northern Railway.

History 
The station opened on 20 September 1847 by the Edinburgh and Northern Railway. The goods yard, closed in 1965, was sited to the west opposite the signal box. The station closed on 1 January 1917 but reopened on 1 February 1919, before closing permanently on 4 September 1967.

References

External links 

Disused railway stations in Fife
Former North British Railway stations
Railway stations in Great Britain opened in 1847
Railway stations in Great Britain closed in 1917
Railway stations in Great Britain opened in 1919
Railway stations in Great Britain closed in 1967 
Beeching closures in Scotland
1847 establishments in Scotland
1967 disestablishments in Scotland